Ganesh Prasad Pandey (born 1954) is an Indian organic chemist and scientist at National Chemical Laboratory. He is known for his researches on photo-induced single electron transfer reactions
and the synthesis of natural products and is an elected fellow of the Indian National Science Academy the National Academy of Sciences, India and the Indian Academy of Sciences The Council of Scientific and Industrial Research, the apex agency of the Government of India for scientific research, awarded him the Shanti Swarup Bhatnagar Prize for Science and Technology, one of the highest Indian science awards, in 1999, for his contributions to chemical sciences.

Biography 

G. P. Pandey, born on 5 July 1954 in the Indian state of Uttar Pradesh, graduated in chemistry from Dr. Bhimrao Ambedkar University and completed his master's degree from the same university. Subsequently, he enrolled for his doctoral studies at Banaras Hindu University from where he secured a PhD and moved to the US in 1980 to pursue his post-doctoral studies at the laboratory of Harry Morrison of Purdue University. After completing his studies on the photobiology of urocanic acid, he returned to India in 1983 and joined Panjab University as a pool officer the same year. However, his stay at the university lasted only a few months and he joined the Indian Institute of Chemical Technology (IICT), Hyderabad in 1984 as a scientist. He served the institute for 7 years before shifting his base to the National Chemical Laboratory, Pune in 1991 as an E2-Grade scientist. He is associated with Molecular Science Laboratory of Sanjay Gandhi Postgraduate Institute of Medical Sciences where he serves as a scientist.

Legacy 
Pandey's early researches were based on photobiology and radical ions initiated by photoinduced electron transfer (PET). Later, he used the PET reactions for organic synthesis and his studies are reported to have widened the understanding of the processes. He leads a team of scientists at NCL who are involved in investigations on target oriented synthesis of natural products and biologically active compounds and the team has developed novel carbon-carbon bond forming reactions assisting in total synthesis of natural products. They have also done extensive studies on glycosidase inhibitors with regard to their design, synthesis and evaluation. His researches have been published as chapters to books authored by others as well as several peer-reviewed scientific articles; ResearchGate, an online repository of science articles, has listed 134 of them. He is the vice-chair of the National Organic Symposium Trust (NOST) and serves as an editor of Tetrahedron journal.

Awards and honors 
Pandey received the Young Scientist Award of the Council of Scientific and Industrial Research in 1988 and the B. M. Birla Science Prize in 1990. The Council of Scientific and Industrial Research honored him again with the Shanti Swarup Bhatnagar Prize, one of the highest Indian science awards, in 1999. He has delivered several award orations including the Professor N. S. Narasimhan Lecture Award of 1998, Professor R. C. Shah Memorial Lecture of 1999, and Professor T. R. Seshadri 70th Birthday Commemoration Lecture of 2003. He was elected by the Indian Academy of Sciences as their fellow in 1995. and he became an elected fellow of the Indian National Science Academy in 1999. He is also an elected fellow of the National Academy of Sciences, India.

See also 
 Photoinduced electron transfer

References 

Recipients of the Shanti Swarup Bhatnagar Award in Chemical Science
1954 births
Indian scientific authors
Fellows of the Indian Academy of Sciences
Fellows of the Indian National Science Academy
Indian organic chemists
Panjab University
Dr. Bhimrao Ambedkar University alumni
Banaras Hindu University alumni
Purdue University alumni
Fellows of The National Academy of Sciences, India
Living people
Scientists from Uttar Pradesh